Calostigma is a genus of flowering plants in the family Apocynaceae, first described as a genus in 1838. The genus is native to South America.

Species

formerly included
moved to other genera (Oxypetalum, Philodendron)

References

Asclepiadoideae
Apocynaceae genera